The Contract is a four track EP from Long Island punk band, Crime In Stereo. It was released in July, 2005 on Blackout Records and was their final recording for the label before a move to Nitro Records. All of the songs on The Contract were re-released recently
on the Love 7" with a bonus track.

Track listing
All songs written by Crime In Stereo
"New Harlem Shuffle" – 2:15
"Long Song Titles Aren't Cool Anymore Because the Rest of You Fuckers are No Good at It" – 0:32
"Jesus is My Ride Home" – 2:37
"Sleeping Androids Do Dream Electric Sheep" – 3:38
"The Return Of..." – 2:32 (bonus track on the Love 7")

Credits
 Kristian Hallbert – vocals
 Alex Dunne – guitar
 Shawn Gardiner – guitar
 Mike Musilli – bass 
 Scotty Giffin – drums
 Produced by Mike Sapone

External links
 Blackout Records album page

Crime in Stereo albums
2005 EPs